The 2017 Women's EuroHockey Club Trophy was the 41st edition of the women's Women's EuroHockey Club Trophy, Europe's secondary club field hockey tournament organized by the EHF. It was held from 2 to 5 June 2017 in Munich, Germany.

Münchner won the tournament after defeating Club de Campo 1–0 in the final. Minsk finished third, after defeating Grodno 5–4 in the third place playoff.

Teams

 Grodno
 Minsk
 Münchner 
 Pegasus
 Amiscora
 Grove Menzieshill
 Club de Campo
 Sumchanka

Results

Preliminary round

Pool A

Pool B

Classification round

Seventh and eighth place

Fifth and sixth place

Third and fourth place

Final

Statistics

Final standings

References

Women's EuroHockey Club Trophy
International women's field hockey competitions hosted by Germany
Sports competitions in Munich
Club Trophy Women
EuroHockey Club Trophy
2010s in Munich